Payola are a six-piece folk/rock/soul band from Auckland, New Zealand.

The group's first release was the album Gone To Ground in 2005. Lead vocalist Solomon Cole had exited his prior band, Auckland based Rootskonductor, to release a solo album through Wellington label Jayrem Records. The album was to be titled "PAYOLA".

Cole enlisted the help of drummer and childhood friend Adrian Bergman and jazz keyboardist Timothy William, a musician introduced through Rootskonductor manager Stephen O'hoy. UK bassist Lee Catlin (formerly of Orange Can) joined shortly after, having responded to an advert posted on the internet. He, in turn, introduced the band to Manchester percussionist Nick Wood to complement the recordings. Rehearsals took place in Mamaku, a remote suburb of Rotorua. The group of players proceeded to form a "band" as the focus of the solo record shifted. The original name of the record was adopted as the band moniker.

The band used the backing vocal services of NZ Idol finalist Indira Moala for initial recordings. However, due to a fees dispute, Moala subsequently and unsuccessfully threatened to sue the band. The dispute was settled amicably and the band recruited Sophia Tupuola to complete the recordings and finish the album.

2008
Musical differences between the band and original drummer Adrian Bergman led to Bergman's exit in early 2008.

In April 2008 Payola won the Jim Beam sponsored Rock FM New Zealand-wide band search competition. The prize was the opening slot at the Vodofone Homegrown Festival held on 26 April 2008 at the waterfront in Wellington, New Zealand. Other bands playing at the event included Shihad, The Mint Chicks and Opshop.

Band members

Current members

 Lee Catlin (Bass/Keys)
 Solomon Cole (Vocals/Guitar)
 Simon McDowell (Drums)
 Ben Teevale (Drums)

Former members
 Timothy William (Keys)
 Adrian Bergman (Drums)
 Nick Wood (Percussion)
 Sophia Tupuola (Vocals)

Discography

Albums

Singles

References

External links
UnderTheRadar.co.nz – Payola
Official site
Vodafone Homegrown 2008
 YouTube – Haunt Me (Official Unreleased)

New Zealand musical groups